Triplett is an unincorporated community in Roane County, in the U.S. state of West Virginia.

History
A post office called Triplett was established in 1888, and remained in operation until 1939. The community was named after nearby Triplett Run.

References

Unincorporated communities in Roane County, West Virginia
Unincorporated communities in West Virginia